The Anglo-Chinese School in Kampar, Perak comprises Sekolah Kebangsaan Methodist (ACS) Kampar and Sekolah Menengah Kebangsaan Methodist (ACS) Kampar.

The buildings are located opposite each other, linked by an overhead bridge that is rarely used by the students.

Founding
ACS Kampar was founded in 1903 by missionary Sir Edmound Horley. The original building is still intact and being used as a primary school.

Origin of Name
The name of the school (A.C.S.) is actually an abbreviation of the words Anglo-Chinese School. It was so named due to the introduction of public English school education managed by the missionary mainly funded by the local Chinese businessmen. The present school's site was said to be donated by the then tin miner Eu Tong Sen.   Similar institutions were established in Ipoh and other major towns.  The schools had been from day one open to all Malayan/Malaysian of All Races.  Many successful scholars and leaders were produced for the country Malaya/Malaysia and Worldwide, getting top honours throughout the world in both institutions of higher learnings, professions, public institutions, civil services and industries.  Following the independence of the then Malaya from the British in 1957, the education system of the nation was revamped altogether.  The name ACS was maintained until the 70's.  It was unnecessary changed to Sekolah Menengah Methodist possibly due to political pressure.

Japanese Occupation
During World War II, the school was used as the main office for the local Japanese administration in Kampar. Also, the assembly grounds for the ACS Secondary School was used as the execution grounds by the troops. Because of this dark period of time, former students of the school have alleged sightings of supernatural beings. Common claims include sounds of Japanese troops marching and beheaded souls wandering around.

Centennial Year
In 2003, ACS Kampar celebrated its 100 years of excellence in education. The celebration was attended by alumni and current students alike.

Achievements
The school has repeatedly been touted as one of the best in town. Students have frequently outperformed other schools in the district, be it in academics, sports, or extracurricular activities. In recent years, the school has been consistently emerged as one of the front-runners for the Majlis Sukan Sekolah-sekolah Perak, which is the state sports council.

Notable alumni

 Datin Paduka Seri Endon Mahmood - late wife of former Prime Minister of Malaysia, Abdullah Ahmad Badawi
 Datuk Seri Mohammad Nizar Jamaluddin - Menteri Besar of Perak

Primary schools in Malaysia
Secondary schools in Malaysia
Publicly funded schools in Malaysia
Kampar District
Methodist schools in Malaysia
1903 establishments in British Malaya
Educational institutions established in 1903